Gregory J. Pope (November 27, 1926 – May 1976) was an American politician who served in the New York State Assembly from 1965 to 1970.

References

1926 births
1976 deaths
Democratic Party members of the New York State Assembly
20th-century American politicians